Whiteley is a community in the county of Hampshire, England, near Fareham. The development straddles the boundary between two council districts: the Borough of Fareham to the south and east, and the city of Winchester to the north and west.

Location
Whiteley is located in southern Hampshire between the cities of Portsmouth and Southampton and close to the market town of Fareham. The small development of 3,000 homes is situated close to Junction 9 of the M27 motorway, while rail services are provided nearby at Swanwick railway station.

History
Whiteley contains a residential community, retail and a business park. Construction of the Solent business park started in the mid-1980s and the first houses were completed in the late 1980s, although construction slowed for a few years following a crash in the British residential property market during the mid-1990s. From 1996 construction recommenced and continues today.

Historically, the site now occupied by Whiteley was farmland and coppice. The nearest historical settlements are those of Park Gate situated just south of Swanwick Hill, Little Park to the South and Swanwick to the West. Farms in the local area included Rookery, Yew Tree, Sweethills and Whiteley.  The wooded areas in Whiteley were used to provide shelter to troops in the build-up of forces for transportation to northern France in preparation for D-Day during the second world war. This is evidenced by the remains of a War Department water tank on the edge of the Bere Forest to the north of the community.

Part of the M27 motorway constructed to the south of the development was opened in February 1978.

The part of the development which falls in the Winchester district became a civil parish in 2003.

One of the earliest buildings in Whiteley was the Solent Hotel and Spa which was constructed in the early 1990s.

Whiteley today

Apart from the residential areas, which house around 6,000 residents, the main focus was the Whiteley Village outlet centre (a retail centre not to be confused with 'Whiteley Village' in Walton-on-Thames). This pedestrianised shopping centre consisted of a number of discount stores, particularly designer fashions. In September 2007, British Land announced plans to spend upwards of £100m redeveloping Whiteley Village and reconstructing it as a district centre, while also adding housing and a hotel to the area.

The Whiteley village Outlet was entirely demolished in Autumn 2011 (finishing by November 2011), with the exception of the medium-sized Tesco supermarket.

The new development was officially opened on Thursday 23 May 2013, with celebrities, such as Denise van Outen opening a new maternity store. Stores include Marks & Spencer, Next plc, Boots, WH Smith and many other common High Street names but there are also other units that were specifically earmarked for local enterprises, such as Walker & Waterer Estate Agents, Hair OTT, Barbers On The Square, Imagin and Go Tech. Restaurants include DimT, Wildwood, Prezzo (restaurant), Harvester (restaurant) and Frankie & Benny's, as well as coffee shops such as Starbucks, Caffè Nero and Costa Coffee, and an indoor climbing and soft play centre, Rock Up. Shop opening times are extended till 8pm on weekdays while restaurants open till 11pm (10:30pm on Sundays). Parking is available for 1500 vehicles and is free for the first 4 hours and after 6pm.

A brand new leisure complex adjacent to Whiteley Shopping, providing a nine screen Cineworld cinema and a further five restaurants including Five Guys, Nandos, Bar & block and Dim T and was opened in November 2015.

Whiteley also contains the sizeable Solent Business Park which consists of a number of large companies, including Zurich Financial Services, the new headquarters for NATS (formerly National Air Traffic Services) and the offices and studios of ITV Meridian. Development at the business park continues as further offices are constructed.

As with many large new developments the community experienced problems in development owing to a slow provision of local amenities. Today the development boasts a modern and sizeable medical centre including a doctors' practice and pharmacy; a private medical establishment incorporating NHS dentists and a physiotherapy clinic; a local store; food take-away stores; a hairdresser; three pre-schools/nurseries; a community centre; a leisure centre; a sizeable recreation ground having football and cricket provision; numerous children's playgrounds; a supermarket and petrol station a skate park; a three-form entry primary school; and maintained wooded areas.

During 2008, Whiteley Parish Council (now Whiteley Town Council), with input from Hampshire County Council, conducted a survey which looked at residents' opinions about road access, housing, retail provision and other aspects of living in Whiteley. 90% of respondents said that Yew Tree Drive or Rookery Avenue, or both, should be opened now, according to the Survey Summary Results.  Following a recent traffic census, Hampshire County Council has carried out a survey within Whiteley and affected surrounding villages (Burridge, Swanwick and Park Gate) asking similar questions, but accompanied with information about the consequences of various road openings.

Demographics
The development has an overwhelmingly young population (79% under 44 years), white (96.95%), home-owning (87.23%) population of professionals and aspirational skilled workers (80% in social grade AB and C1). Whiteley is reported by the local health authority to have a higher than average rate of divorce and separation (11% versus 6% nationally).

The future
The area north of Whiteley was included in the South East Plan as a possible urban extension and when the community is expanded northwards it will include further residential developments of 3,500 houses and associated infrastructure including transport, educational and community facilities.

References

External links
The Whiteley Forum
Whiteley Primary School
Whiteley Town Council

Borough of Fareham